Broken Blossoms is a 1936 British drama film directed by John Brahm and starring Emlyn Williams, Arthur Margetson, Basil Radford and Edith Sharpe. Director Bernard Vorhaus was technical supervisor.

The film is based on the short story "The Chink and the Child" by Thomas Burke from his collection Limehouse Nights (1916), and was produced at Twickenham Studios in London. The story had previously been adapted by D. W. Griffith for his film Broken Blossoms (1919) starring Lillian Gish.

Plot
A Chinese missionary comes to London where he works in the slums and helps a young girl being ill-treated by her abusive father.

Cast
 Dolly Haas as Lucy Burrows
 Emlyn Williams as Chen
 Arthur Margetson as Battling Burrows
 C. V. France as High Priest
 Basil Radford as Mr. Reed
 Edith Sharpe as Mrs. Reed
 Ernest Jay as Alf
 Bertha Belmore as Daisy
 Gibb McLaughlin as Evil Eye
 Ernest Sefton as Manager
 Donald Calthrop as Old Chinaman
 Kathleen Harrison as Mrs. Lossy
 Kenneth Villiers as Missionary
 Dorothy Minto as  Woman
 Sam Wilkinson as Guide
 Jerry Verno as Bert

References

External links
 
 

1936 films
1936 drama films
Films directed by John Brahm
Films based on short fiction
Films based on works by Thomas Burke
British drama films
British black-and-white films
Films set in London
British remakes of American films
Sound film remakes of silent films
1930s English-language films
1930s British films
Films shot at Twickenham Film Studios